The Bitmap Brothers are a British  video game developer founded in 1987. The company entered the video game industry in 1988 with the scrolling shooter Xenon. They quickly followed with Speedball. Prior to becoming the publisher of their own games (under Renegade Software), early Bitmap Brothers titles were distributed by Image Works and Konami.

The Bitmap Brothers released several games on the Amiga and Atari ST, and were one of the most successful companies on those platforms. They became known in particular for releasing games from a variety of different genres that usually came to be regarded as leaders in their respective fields. Their PC games have never matched the sales of their previous Amiga titles, despite garnering positive critical reviews in the press.

They publicized themselves as rock stars, and were featured in the press posing in dark glasses standing next to the helicopter of Robert Maxwell, the owner of Mirrorsoft, the publisher of a number of their games.

After 2002, the company also released ports of several of their games for both the Game Boy Advance and Pocket PC platforms, and since then they have been licensing their old games and properties to several other companies interested in attempting re-releases for modern platforms.

History
The Bitmap Brothers were based in Wapping, East London and were privately owned. The company's MD was Mike Montgomery, who had founded the company together with Eric Matthews and Steve Kelly. Mike Montgomery later went on to take sole control of the business.

Mark John Coleman is a computer graphics developer who frequently worked with the Bitmap Brothers, and along with Dan Malone was responsible for the visual style that became a trademark of the Bitmap Brothers' games. Other key staff included Technical Director John Phillips, Art Director John Kershaw, Business Development Director Ed Bartlett and Creative Director Jamie Barber.

The Bitmap Brothers became known for the high difficulty of their games. Montgomery later remarked that "all of the Bitmap Brothers games... they're probably a bit too difficult. The reason for that was we designed games that we wanted to play - for us it was actually quite hard to think that somebody would want to play something that's easy." The development team was voted Best 16-bit Programmers of the Year at the Golden Joystick Awards. Speedball was also voted best 16-bit Game of the Year overall.

Two former core members of the company — Mike Montgomery and John Phillips — went on to found Tower Studios (along with Sensible Software founder Jon Hare), and stated their involvement with Bitmap Brothers as having ended in 2004.

Business Development Director, Ed Bartlett went on to pioneer the in-game advertising industry, initially with Hive Partners and then with IGA Worldwide.

After years of silence a news post on the official website announced Speedball 2 Tournament which was released in November 2007 by Frogster Interactive, but failed to achieve the success of previous titles in the franchise.

In October 2010, it was announced that Speedball 2 would be resurrected again, this time for the iPhone and iPad systems, with Vivid Games managing the conversion.

Following this, a mobile version of Z was developed by Peter Harrap and TickTock Games and was published by KavCom for devices running iOS and Android, with the touch screen usually available on these devices lending itself to a game of this genre.. It was released on iPhone and iPad in 2011, with further releases on BlackBerry Playbook, Android, and GOG.com on 4 July 2014, together with a Steam release of Z: Steel Soldiers the following month.

On 2 July 2012, Speedball 2: Evolution was announced and released for Android in Google Play Store, and in 2013 The Chaos Engine was recreated for release on PC, Linux and Mac.

Rebellion Developments acquired the Bitmap Brothers back catalog in November 2019.

Titles 
In chronological order:

 Xenon (1988)
 Speedball (1988)
 Xenon II: Megablast (1989)
 Cadaver (1990)
 Speedball 2: Brutal Deluxe (1990)
 Cadaver: The Payoff (1991)
 Gods (1991)
 Bike / Triple X / Havoc (cancelled)
 Magic Pockets (1991)
 The Chaos Engine (Soldiers of Fortune) (1993, 2013)
 The Chaos Engine 2 (1996)
 Z (1996)
 Speedball 2100 (2000)
 Xenon 2000 (2000)
 Z: Steel Soldiers (2001)
 Speedball Arena (cancelled)
 Warbots (unreleased)
 World War II: Frontline Command (2003)
 Brutal Deluxe / ブルータル デラックス (unreleased)
 SpeedBall 2: Evolution (2012)

References

External links
  via Internet Archive

1987 establishments in England
British companies established in 1987
Companies based in the London Borough of Tower Hamlets
Golden Joystick Award winners
Video game companies established in 1987
Video game companies of the United Kingdom
Video game development companies